was a Japanese daimyō of the Edo period, who ruled the Yoshida Domain. He held several positions in the Tokugawa shogunate, including that of Kyoto Shoshidai.

1793 births
1844 deaths
Daimyo
Kyoto Shoshidai
Ōkōchi-Matsudaira clan
Rōjū